Livingstone is an outer rural locality Darwin. The name "Livingstone" derived from the war-time airstrip which was named after John D Livingstone, Jnr. On 4 April 1942, Livingstone was wounded during action over Darwin, but flew to the newly completed 34 mile airstrip where he crash landed, but died in the resultant inferno. He was buried at "The Gardens Cemetery". The 34 Mile strip was named Livingstone in his honour.  Livingstone has a rural recreation reserve managed by community management committee and provides a Friday night 34 mile bar and bistro frequented by locals and visitors.

References

External links

Suburbs of Darwin, Northern Territory